The Swindon and Cricklade Railway is a heritage railway in Wiltshire, England, that operates on a short section of the old Midland and South Western Junction Railway line between Swindon and Cricklade.

Swindon and Cricklade Railway is a registered charity.

Preservation history 
The Swindon and Cricklade Railway Preservation Society was formed by a group of enthusiasts in November 1978 to reconstruct and preserve a section of the Midland & South Western Junction Railway that ran from Andover, Hampshire, to Cheltenham, Gloucestershire.

Hayes Knoll features a restored signalbox that is operational during special events and a running/restoration shed. The length of the restored line is a little under .

The line extends north to South Meadow Lane (a few hundred yards from the site of a proposed Farfield Lane halt) near Cricklade, and south to Taw Valley Halt on the outskirts of Swindon, near Mouldon Hill Country Park. A southern terminus, is proposed within the park.

Locomotives

Steam locomotives

Diesel locomotives
BR Class 03  – 03 022. Returned to service in October 2019 after a general overhaul.
BR Class 03  – D2152 – cut-down cab variant. In regular service.
BR Class 97/6  – PWM651. Arrived from Strathspey Railway in August 2015.  Operational.
BR Class 08  – D3261. Restored to service in October 2010.
BR Class 73 Bo-Bo electro-diesel Sir Herbert Walker No E6003. In service.
Fowler  Woodbine No 21442. In service.
Fowler  No 7342. In regular use on works trains.
Fowler  No 4220031. Re-engined with Rolls Royce C6, mainly used as shed/yard shunter.

Diesel multiple units
BR Class 119 unit 119 021 (formed of 51074+51104). Operational. 
BR Class 207 unit 207 203 (formed of 60127+60901). In service until destroyed in a fire on 20 May 2016.
BR British Railways AC railbus no. W79978 undergoing restoration

Specialist vehicles
TASC 45 No. 98504, built by Plasser & Theurer for British Rail. A four-wheel vehicle with side-tipping dropside rear body, crew cab with mess facilities and a HIAB crane on the rear. Used regularly on works trains and on galas.
Wickham trolley No 9031 (Type 27 Mk III, Works No. 8089), a small four-wheeled vehicle for departmental use. Crew cab seating eight. Has no external couplings/drawbar or buffers. Operational and fitted with Kohler diesel engine.

Vintage railway coaches

Wagons

Stations of the S&CR line

References

External links

 

Heritage railways in Wiltshire
Transport in Swindon
Cricklade